Yves Frémion (born 1947 in Lyon) is a French author and former editor of the French science fiction magazine Univers.  He has also edited a number of anthologies and has worked for the comic and humour magazine Fluide Glacial.  Most recently, he is the author of the book Orgasms of History: 3000 years of spontaneous insurrection, which charts episodes of "revolt and utopia" throughout history.

He is a member of the French Green Party and is a former member of the European Parliament.

Bibliography
L'hétéradelphe de Gane (winner Prix Rosny-Aîné 1990)
Les nouveaux petits-miquets
Octobre, octobres
Rêves de sable, châteaux de sang
Rönge
Orgasms of History: 3000 Years of Spontaneous Insurrection (2002)

French science fiction writers
Living people
1947 births
French male novelists